Juan Eduardo Eluchans (born 14 April 1980) is an Argentine footballer who plays for Atlético de Rafaela of the Argentine Primera División.

Club career

SM Caen
In June 2007, Eluchans was transferred to Ligue 1 side SM Caen, signing a two-year contract in a €1 million deal. His league debut came on 4 August against Nice. He scored his first goal for the club in a 2–2 draw with Sochaux. After several weeks of adaptation, Eluchans conquered the fans of the team and fully participated in the club season.

Universidad Católica
Eluchans signed for the Chilean Primera División side Universidad Católica on 26 June 2010, agreeing on a one-year deal, and keeping him with the precordilleran club until winter 2011. He made his debut in a league game against Cobreloa in a 2–1 home win. Eluchans failed to have a good performance in the team during his first games in the club, but at the end of the tournament he achieved a good performance in the position of left back.

On 27 November 2010, Católica gain a crucial victory 3–2 at Calama to Cobreloa in the penultimate week of the league tournament, beating Colo-Colo in top-of-the-table by 3 points. In the same game, Eluchans scored the victory goal, after a free kick at 89th minute. In the next game, his club was proclaimed champion of the Chilean football after beat 5–0 to Everton.

In 2011, Eluchans achieved a good performance at Católica, scoring three important goals for the club, among themselves two goals of free kick against Santiago Wanderers and Colo-Colo. He became a key player during the team's good season. Because his performances, he received several offers from important clubs of South America.

However, his team loss the final of the playoffs championship against Universidad de Chile, Católica lost in the aggregate result for 4–3 loss, and Eluchans along with his teammates Rodrigo Valenzuela, Alfonso Parot and Francisco Pizarro protagonized a scandal insulting to the referee Enrique Osses.

Banfield
After his successful pass at Católica, Eluchans was released of the Chilean club and shortly after he joined to Banfield of the Argentine Primera División.

On 5 August 2011, Eluchans made his debut for Banfield in the 2–0 loss against Atlético Rafaela.

Honours

Club
Independiente
 Primera División Argentina (1): 2002 Apertura

Universidad Católica
 Primera División de Chile (1): 2010

External links
Statistics at Guardian Stats Centre

1980 births
Living people
Argentine footballers
Argentine expatriate footballers
Argentine people of French descent
People from Tandil
Association football wingers
Club Atlético Independiente footballers
Club Deportivo Universidad Católica footballers
Atlético de Rafaela footballers
Rosario Central footballers
Club Atlético Banfield footballers
Stade Malherbe Caen players
Ligue 1 players
Chilean Primera División players
Argentine Primera División players
Expatriate footballers in Chile
Expatriate footballers in France
Argentine expatriate sportspeople in France
Sportspeople from Buenos Aires Province